Where's Officer Tuba? (Chinese: 霹靂大喇叭) is a 1986 Hong Kong action comedy film directed by Philip Chan and Ricky Lau and starring Sammo Hung, Jacky Cheung, David Chiang and Joey Wong. The film was later remade as Look Out, Officer! in 1990 which starred Stephen Chow.

Plot
Police Officer Tuba is a timid man who would rather play in the police band than get involved in any real police work. The precincts' most decorated officer, Sergeant Rambo Chow, decides to use Tuba in an undercover operation that goes disastrously wrong when Chow is killed. He makes Tuba promise to get the criminals to avenge him before he dies, and Tuba reluctantly agrees but does not really intend to keep his promise. Later, teamed with an enthusiastic rookie cop Cheung, Tuba has conveniently forgotten his promise, until the ghost of Chow comes back to haunt him. Interfering in his work and his private life, especially his budding romance with the pretty Joanne so that everyone starts to think that Tuba is going crazy. With Tuba the only person who can see or hear the ghost, he finds he has to listen and for once in his life, be brave, otherwise, he could be tormented by his unwanted spiritual visitor for the rest of his life.

Cast
Sammo Hung as Officer Tuba
Jacky Cheung as Cheung
David Chiang as Sergeant Rambo Chow
Joey Wong as Joanne
Stanley Fung as police band drummer
Paul Chun as police band trumpet player
Paul Chang as Chung
Bowie Wu as Sau
Teddy Yip as Joanne's father
Tai Po as drug addict
Melvin Wong as Rambo's superior officer
Lam Ching-ying as Taoist priest (cameo)
Yuen Wah as Extortion gang member
Corey Yuen as Taoist priest in deity Chun Kui costume
Tin Ching as Tuba's superior officer
David Wu as rapist in park
Dennis Chan as Sergeant assigning job
Alfred Cheung as man at pier/telephone boot
Hwang Jang-lee as Extortion gang member
Chang Yi as Extortion gang leader
Ka Lee as crazy man with chopper
Kam Piu as Chairman Kan
Chiu Chi-ling as mental patient
Billy Chan as wanted thug
Yuen Miu as cop arresting wanted man
Siu Tak-foo as cop arresting wanted man
Seung Yee as Joanne's mother
Lo Hung as Police station chief
John Shum as man taking pictures on pier
Chan King as man on pier
Lau Hok-nin as van driver
Chun Kwai-po as cop arresting wanted man
Cheung Wing-cheung
Lo Sai-kwan as Extortion gang member
David Lo as David
Ken Boyle as Commissioner Tones
Tsui Oi-sam
Kwan Chi-piu
Shrila Chun
Chong Man-ching
Angela Yu Chien
Chow Lai-kuen as undercover cop
Dick Son
Yeung Wai-ling
Helen Au
Bolo Yeung
Hui Yat-wah
Ting Tung
Garry Chan as Extortion gang member
Chang Sing-kwong

Box office
The film grossed HK$16,822,229 at the Hong Kong box office during its theatrical run from 20 March to 9 April 1986 in Hong Kong.

See also
Sammo Hung filmography
Jacky Cheung filmography

External links

Where's Officer Tuba? at Hong Kong Cinemagic

1986 films
1986 martial arts films
1980s action comedy films
1980s ghost films
Hong Kong action comedy films
Hong Kong slapstick comedy films
Hong Kong martial arts films
Kung fu films
Hong Kong ghost films
Police detective films
1980s Cantonese-language films
Golden Harvest films
Films set in Hong Kong
Hong Kong films about revenge
1986 comedy films
Films directed by Philip Chan
1980s Hong Kong films